Kim Kwang-hyop (1915 – 1970) was a politician anti-Japanese activist and a military officer and politician of the Democratic People's Republic of Korea (commonly, North Korea). He served as Chief of the General Staff of the Korean People's Army.

Biography
He was born in Hoeryong, North Hamgyong Province, in 1915. In 1930, at the age of 16, he moved to China and graduated from Huangpu Military Academy, where he worked as an anti-Japanese partisan. In 1935 he joined the Communist Party of China, and in 1940 he served as the second member of the Northeast Anti-Japanese United Army's Second Army. After the fall of the Japanese Empire, he became the commander of the military district of the Northeast Democratic Army of the pro-Soviet Provisional People's Committee of North Korea.

At the onset of the Korean War he was the commander of the Second Army of the Korean People's Army. After the armistice of the Korean War, he was promoted to the Chief of the General Staff of the Korean People's Army. He served as a delegate to the Supreme People's Assembly in following the 1957 North Korean parliamentary election and from September that year until October 1962 he was also Minister of People's Armed Forces.

|-

|-

References

Members of the 2nd Supreme People's Assembly
Members of the 3rd Supreme People's Assembly
Members of the 4th Supreme People's Assembly
Workers' Party of Korea politicians
Korean communists
Korean independence activists
People from Hoeryong
1915 births
1970 deaths
North Korean military personnel of the Korean War
North Korean generals
People of 88th Separate Rifle Brigade